The Miracle We Met is a 2018 South Korean television series starring Kim Myung-min, Kim Hyun-joo, Ra Mi-ran, Ko Chang-seok and Joseph Lee. It aired from April 2 to May 29, 2018, on KBS2's Mondays and Tuesdays at 22:00 (KST) time slot.

Synopsis
An ordinary man dies in a car crash, but his spirit awakes inside another man with the same name and age but an entirely different background. He becomes the head of two families and agonizes over his two different wives.

Cast

Main
 Kim Myung-min as Song Hyun-chul (A)
 Kim Hyun-joo as Sun Hye-jin
 Ra Mi-ran as Jo Yeon-hwa
 Ko Chang-seok as Song Hyun-chul (B)
 Joseph Lee as Keum Sung-moo

Supporting

People around Song Hyun-chul (A)
 Yoon Seok Hwa as Hwang Geum-nyeo
 Hwang Bo-ra as Song Sa-ran
 Seo Dong-hyun as Song Kang-ho
 Kim Ha-yoo as Song Mi-ho
 Choi Byung-mo as "Ttak-pool" Heo Dong-gu
 Hwang Seok-jeong as Lim Do-hee

People around Song Hyun-chul (B)
 Lee Do-kyung as Song Mo-dong
 Kim Hwan-hee as Song Ji-soo
 Jeon Seok-ho as Park Dong-soo
 Kim Mi-hwa as Jin-soo's mother
 Lee Eun-saem as Young-ju

Shinhwa Bank Staff
 Yoon Ji-hye  as Kwak Hyo-joo
 Jung Suk-yong as Yook Bang-woo
 Bae Yoon-kyung as Sun Hye-jin
 Choi Seong-won as Assistant Manager Ha
 Lee Moo-saeng as Deputy Department Head Kim
 Lee Bom-so-ri as Seo He-joo
 Park Keun-rok as Park Jong-won
 Jung Han-yong as Kim Sang-jo
 Park Sung-keun as Oh Jang-choon

God figures
 Kim Jong-in as Ato
 Kim Jae-yong/Kim Jae-kyung as Mao

Special appearance
 Kim Won-hae as Mortician (Ep. 1, 3, 8)
 Kim Su-ro as Cathedral priest (Ep. 3, 11)
 Kim Jae-kyung as Mao's other personality (Ep. 3)
 Yoon Da-hoon as Seo Min-joon, psychologist (Ep. 8)
 Jung Sang-hoon as Drama PD (Ep. 9)
 Park Jun-gyu as Song Hyun-chul (B)'s friend
 Kim Min-jong as Kim Man-jong, program MC (Ep. 11)

Production
 The first script reading took place on February 12, 2018 at KBS Annex Building. 
 Choi Ji-woo was offered the female lead role but declined.

Original soundtrack

Part 1

Part 2

Part 3

Part 4

Part 5

Viewership

Awards and nominations

References

External links
  
 
 
 

Korean Broadcasting System television dramas
Korean-language television shows
2018 South Korean television series debuts
2018 South Korean television series endings
South Korean romance television series
South Korean melodrama television series
Fiction about body swapping
Television series by AStory